The 1971–72 Marquette Warriors men's basketball team represented the Marquette University in the 1971–72 season. The Warriors finished the regular season with a record of 25–4.

Roster

Schedule

Team players drafted into the NBA

External links
MUScoop's MUWiki

References 

Marquette
Marquette Golden Eagles men's basketball seasons
Marquette
Marquette
Marquette